
 
 

Sherwood is a locality in the Australian state of South Australia located about  south-east of the state capital of Adelaide and about  north-west of the municipal seat of Bordertown.

Boundaries for the locality were created on 16 March 2000 for the “long established name.”

Sherwood is served by Emu Flat Road which passes through the locality from the Ngarkat Highway in the east where the highway forms the locality’s eastern boundary to Keith in the west where the road terminates in the Keith town centre.

The principal land use in the locality is primary production.  A parcel of land at its eastern boundary has protected area status as the Hardings Springs Conservation Reserve.

The 2016 Australian census which was conducted in August 2016 reports that Sherwood had a population of 97 people.

Sherwood is located within the federal division of Barker, the state electoral district of MacKillop and the local government area of the Tatiara District Council.

References

 

Towns in South Australia
Limestone Coast